Michael Huber (born 14 January 1990) is an Austrian professional footballer who plays for Grazer AK.

Club career
On 15 June 2021, he signed a two-year contract with Grazer AK.

References

External links
 

1990 births
People from Oberwart
Footballers from Burgenland
Living people
Austrian footballers
Association football defenders
SV Stegersbach players
SC-ESV Parndorf 1919 players
TSV Hartberg players
SKN St. Pölten players
Grazer AK players
Austrian Football Bundesliga players
2. Liga (Austria) players